Castle Keep is a 1969 American comedy-drama war film combining surrealism with tragic realism.  It was directed by Sydney Pollack and starred Burt Lancaster, Patrick O'Neal, Jean-Pierre Aumont, Bruce Dern, and Peter Falk. The film appeared in the summer of 1969, a few months before the premiere of Pollack's smash hit They Shoot Horses, Don't They?

The film is based on the novel of the same name by William Eastlake published in 1965, and has the dubious distinction of being one of the very few war films that is both pro and anti war at the same time.  Eastlake enlisted in the United States Army in 1942. He served in the Infantry for four and a half years, and was wounded while leading a platoon during the Battle of the Bulge.

Plot
The film opens with long, beautiful shots of ancient European art and sculptures being blown to pieces amidst the sounds of war and dissonant screams while a lone narrator begins his tale of "eight American soldiers", when suddenly, and abruptly, the scene jumps back to a few weeks earlier.

It is December 1944, and a ragtag group of American soldiers (implied to be a group of wounded sent for some quiet R & R) slowly enter the scene, riding on a problematic Jeep towing a small trailer.  The group is led by the one-eyed Major Abraham Falconer (Burt Lancaster) and includes Sgt. Rossi (Peter Falk), art expert Captain Beckman (Patrick O'Neal), and the highly intelligent narrator, African-American Pvt. Allistair Benjamin (Al Freeman Jr.).  They take shelter in a magnificent 10th century Belgian castle, the Maldorais, which contains many priceless and irreplaceable art treasures.

While at the castle, Falconer begins a love affair with the young and beautiful Countess (Astrid Heeren); and is surprised to find that she is not the Count's niece but is actually the Count's wife.  The Count of Maldorais, Henri Tixier (Jean-Pierre Aumont), admits to Falconer that he is impotent, and he hopes that the Major will impregnate the Countess so that his line may continue. Meanwhile, Beckman begins to argue with Falconer over both the value of the art (in the context of either saving or destroying it in the event of a German assault) as well as Beckman's own unrequited attraction for the Countess, who seems to symbolize the beauty and majesty of the European art that he had studied before the war. Beckman marvels at the castle's artworks, which he begins to inventory and store beneath the castle for safekeeping, while the enlisted men seek their own pleasures at the psychedelic "Reine Rouge" (Red Queen) brothel in the nearby town, run by a mystic madam.  At the same time, Sgt. Rossi, a baker before the war, falls in love with a baker's widow and goes AWOL, resuming his pre-war life in the village boulangerie. Corporal Clearboy falls in love with a Volkswagen Beetle; with his affection for the vehicle bordering on paraphilia which becomes a long-running and anachronistic gag throughout the rest of the film.

The American soldiers are happy to enjoy a respite from combat while being surrounded by unimaginable antique luxury, however, their days of leisure and peace almost undermine the very reality and the ugliness of the war itself.  There is also a recurring theme of eternal recurrence, as one soldier drunkenly ponders out loud that maybe he's "been here before". And, although the men are eager to sit out the war that they feel will soon end, there is a sense of foreboding, a feeling of inevitability of what will eventually transpire.  The cynical Major Falconer predicts that the Germans will attack the thin American positions in the Ardennes and that the castle is a strategic point in the Germans' advance towards the crossroads of Bastogne. He is soon proved correct after seeing German star shell signals over the town of St. Croix

The war approaches piece by crazy piece: A band of zealous, hymn-singing conscientious objectors, led by Lt. Billy Byron Bix (Bruce Dern), attempts to evangelize the town and are driven away by Sgt. Rossi.  And while horseback riding with the Count, the Major discovers a German reconnaissance patrol whose officer was once billeted in the castle and was a previous lover of the Countess (he in fact abandoned his men in an attempt to see the Countess again) and Falconer kills them all.  The Count is both disquieted and impressed by Falconer's ruthless efficiency. A German recon plane buzzes the castle; Beckman, under Falconer's direction, shoots it down with a .50-caliber machine gun.  Lt. Amberjack and Sgt. Rossi have a very strange encounter with a German skirmisher.

Captain Beckman and the Count are horrified that the Major will not abandon the castle, a decision that will surely lead to its destruction; Falconer, however, is adamant that to give the Germans one thing means that they'll just end up "taking everything" later on (see appeasement). Falconer prepares defensive positions around the castle and sends his unit into town to delay the Nazi advance.  He attempts to rally shell shocked American troops retreating from the Ardennes into the Maldorais, forcing (at gunpoint) Lt. Bix (Bruce Dern) and his band to lead the dazed survivors in a bizarre Pied Piper-esque procession to the castle; until they are all killed by artillery fire.

The Germans are initially taken by surprise as Falconer has taught the local sex workers at the "Reine Rouge" how to ambush tanks with Molotov cocktails. Falconer's ragtag soldiers, scrounging heavy weapons abandoned by retreating GIs, inflict many casualties and Lt. Amberjack and Private Elk even manage to steal and re-purpose a working German tank, which they jokingly claim "is better than ours." However, the defenders soon find themselves outnumbered and outgunned, and eventually retreat to the castle.

At the castle, Falconer finds that the Count has run over to the German lines and Beckman thinks that it is a scheme to betray them and let the Germans seize the castle by using the underground storage tunnels to gain access and take the castle without destroying it.  These are the same tunnels Beckman has stored the most important artworks in.  Falconer orders Beckman to demolish the tunnel when the Germans enter; heartbroken, Beckman complies under the eyes of the Countess.  The Germans believe that the Count directed them into a trap and he is gunned down despite his denials.
 
The final battle scene is bizarre, with the enemy attacking through the rose garden and attempting to cross the castle's moat using a ladder-carrying fire truck, but Falconer has the moat filled with gasoline and set on fire.  The Americans take their toll on the Germans but are eventually killed off one by one, as much of the castle (along with its art treasures) is obliterated by artillery, incendiaries and other weapons. Part of the ending is brilliantly overdubbed by the narrator who explains (which is how Pvt. Benjamin's book will eventually read) how all the Americans survive, when in fact we can clearly see on the screen that all the Americans (except Pvt. Benjamin) die.

Falconer and Beckman, both wounded, put aside their personal and ideological differences and grimly prepare for the oncoming final assault with a .50 caliber machine gun pointed across the castle roof. Pvt. Benjamin and a pregnant Countess, following the orders of Maj. Falconer, escape through an underground tunnel that leads away from the Germans. Falconer begins to think of all of the people whom he has killed or have died because of his actions as well as the Countess as he guns down the rapidly approaching swarm of German soldiers, implying that he did indeed feel guilty about their deaths and that he loved the Countess much more than he let on.  A shell finally lands on top of his position and explodes; the screen goes white. The film finishes where it began, echoing the theme of eternal recurrence, with more long shots of the undemolished Maldorais as it once stood, as well as a voice-over of Pvt. Benjamin's narration from the very beginning, and then the final credits roll.

Cast
 Burt Lancaster as Major Abraham Falconer
 Patrick O'Neal as Captain Lionel Beckman
 Jean-Pierre Aumont as the Count of Maldorais
 Peter Falk as Sergeant Rossi
 Astrid Heeren as the Countess Therese
 Scott Wilson as Corporal Clearboy
 Tony Bill as Lieutenant Amberjack
 Al Freeman Jr. as Private Allistair Piersall Benjamin
 James Patterson as Elk
 Bruce Dern as Lieutenant Billy Byron Bix
 Michael Conrad as Sergeant DeVaca
 Caterina Boratto as Red Queen
 Olga Bisera as the	Baker's Wife

Production
The film was shot in Kamenica Park, in Sremska Kamenica, in the city of Novi Sad, Serbia. Sydney Pollack recalled that Burt Lancaster first wished him to direct the film in 1966, and that the castle which was made of styrofoam, was inspired by Walt Disney and dreams.

Release
The film opened at the Loew's State II and Loew’s Orpheum theatres in New York City on July 23, 1969, grossing $94,000 in its first week.

See also
 List of American films of 1969

References

External links
 
 
 
 New York Times review
 Turner Classic Movies review
 
 
 

1969 films
1969 war films
American war films
Columbia Pictures films
Films based on American novels
Films directed by Sydney Pollack
Films scored by Michel Legrand
Films set in 1944
Films set in Belgium
Films set in castles
Western Front of World War II films
Filmways films
American World War II films
Films shot in Serbia
1960s English-language films
1960s American films